The Cuba–Jamaica Maritime Boundary Agreement is a 1994 treaty between Cuba and Jamaica which delimits the maritime boundary between the two island countries.

The treaty was signed in Kingston, Jamaica on 18 February 1994. The text of the treaty establishes a boundary in the waters above the Cayman Trough that is 175 nautical miles long and unusually complex. The boundary consists of 105 straight-line maritime segments defined by 106 individual coordinate points. The complexity of the boundary was a result of relatively strict adherence to the principle of forming a border at the precise equidistant line between the two territories. The far western point of the border is an as-yet unconfirmed tripoint with the Cayman Islands.

The treaty came into force on 18  July 1995 after it was ratified by both states. The full name of the treaty is Agreement between the Government of the Jamaica and the Government of the Republic of Cuba on the delimitation of the maritime boundary between the two States.

Name
Cuba—Jamaica Maritime Border Agreement is an Agreement between the Government of the Jamaica and the Government of the Republic of Cuba on the delimitation of the maritime boundary between the two States

References
Ewan W. Anderson (2003). International Boundaries: A Geopolitical Atlas (Routledge: New York) p. 217
Jonathan I. Charney, David A. Colson, Robert W. Smith (eds., 2005). International Maritime Boundaries 5 vols. (American Society of International Law; Hotei Publishing: Leiden) pp. 2205–2218.

External links
Full text of agreement

1994 in Cuba
1994 in Jamaica
Cuba–Jamaica border
Boundary treaties
Treaties of Cuba
Treaties of Jamaica
Treaties concluded in 1994
Treaties entered into force in 1995
United Nations treaties